The 2022–23 Boston College Eagles men's basketball team represented Boston College during the 2022–23 NCAA Division I men's basketball season. The Eagles, were led by second-year head coach Earl Grant, played their home games at the Conte Forum as members of the Atlantic Coast Conference.

Previous season
The Eagles finished the 2021–22 season 13–20, 6–14 in ACC play to finish in a three way tie for eleventh place.  As the thirteenth seed in the ACC tournament, they defeated twelfth seed Pittsburgh in the first round and fifth seed Wake Forest in the second round before losing to fourth seed Miami in the quarterfinals.

Offseason

Departures

Incoming transfers

2022 recruiting class

2023 Recruiting class

Roster

Schedule and results

Source:

|-
!colspan=9 style=| Regular season

|-
!colspan=12 style=|ACC tournament

Rankings

*AP does not release post-NCAA tournament rankings and the Coaches poll did not release a Week 1 poll.

References

Boston College Eagles men's basketball seasons
Boston College
Boston College Eagles men's basketball
Boston College Eagles men's basketball
Boston College Eagles men's basketball
Boston College Eagles men's basketball